Daniel Wilmering (born 19 December 2000), is an Australian professional footballer who plays as a defender for Western Sydney Wanderers.

Personal life 
Wilmering attended Westfields Sports High School.

Career

Western Sydney Wanderers
Wilmering made his professional debut on 17 March 2019, replacing Raúl Llorente in the 94th minute as the Wanderers were downed 3–1 by Wellington Phoenix at Westpac Stadium.

On 3 July 2019, he signed a two-year scholarship contract with Western Sydney, famously graduating from being a ball boy at the Wanderers’ first ever A-League match in 2012.

References

External links

2000 births
Living people
Australian soccer players
Association football defenders
Western Sydney Wanderers FC players
Marconi Stallions FC players
A-League Men players